Nilesh Dashrath Girkar is an Indian scriptwriter who works for Hindi and Telugu films. He started his career writing for Ram Gopal Varma's Agyaat (2009).  He has also written Ram Gopal Varma’s Department (2012) featuring Amitabh Bachchan, Sanjay Dutt and Rana Daggubati; Sarkar 3 and Nana Patekar’s much-awaited film, Ab Tak Chhappan 2 (2015).

Background 
Born and brought up in Mumbai in a middle-class family, he was an avid Bollywood film buff since childhood.  After graduating in Physics from the University of Mumbai, he worked as a Quality Assurance in one of Mumbai’s leading Medical Transcription BPO’s for a few years before quitting his job in 2008.  Meeting Boman Irani on the sets of ‘Bollywood Ka Boss’ Filmy Gyan Quiz Show in 2008 set the tone to follow his dreams and give screenplay writing a shot at.

Before turning full-fledged scriptwriter he had assisted eminent writer/director from Marathi Theater Devendra Pem for around two years and worked on his theatrical play Lali-Lila (a Marathi/Gujarati/Hindi comedy play on Siamese twin sisters).  He also worked as an actor, back stage, and in various capacities in Marathi Theater for few of his one-act plays.

In fact he penned his first script while in the office during his tedious medical transcriptionist days.  On the basis of that script, he got his first break at RGV’s Dreamforce Enterprise with Agyaat in 2009.

Nilesh won a bitter battle with Director RGV, over his writing credits for Sarkar 3 movie.

Filmography

Reference page

References

Indian male screenwriters
Living people
Year of birth missing (living people)
People from Mumbai Suburban district
University of Mumbai alumni
Hindi screenwriters
Telugu screenwriters
Screenwriters from Mumbai